Lat Yao may refer to:

Lat Yao District, a district (amphoe) in Thailand's Nakhon Sawan Province
Lat Yao Subdistrict, a subdistrict (tambon) within the district
Lat Yao Subdistrict, Bangkok, a subdistrict (khwaeng) in Bangkok's Chatuchak District
Lat Yao Prison, an informal name of Klong Prem Central Prison, in Chatuchak's Lat Yao Subdistrict